KSEN (1150 AM) is a radio station licensed to serve Shelby, Montana. The station is owned by Townsquare Media, and licensed to Townsquare License, LLC. It airs an oldies music format.

The stations studios are at 830 Oilfield Avenue in Shelby, along with KZIN-FM. The transmitter site is south of town, along Interstate 15.

The station was assigned the KSEN call letters by the Federal Communications Commission.

Ownership
In February 2008, Colorado-based GAPWEST Broadcasting completed the acquisition of 57 radio stations in 13 markets in the Pacific Northwest-Rocky Mountain region from Clear Channel Communications. The deal, valued at a reported $74 million, included two stations in Shelby, six Bozeman stations, seven in Missoula, and five in Billings, Montana. Other stations in the deal are located in Casper and Cheyenne, Wyoming, plus Pocatello and Twin Falls, Idaho, and Yakima, Washington. GapWest was folded into Townsquare Media on August 13, 2010.

References

External links
KSEN website
Flash Stream, MP3 Stream

SEN
Oldies radio stations in the United States
Toole County, Montana
Townsquare Media radio stations